Geoffrey Robinson could refer to:

 Geoffrey Robinson (bishop)
 Geoffrey Robinson (politician)